The Lophiocarpaceae are a family of flowering plants comprising mostly succulent subshrubs and herbaceous species native to tropical to southern sub-Saharan Africa to western India. It includes the genera Corbichonia and Lophiocarpus. The family is newly recognized through research by the Angiosperm Phylogeny Group III system to deal with long-standing phylogenetic difficulties in placing various genera within the Caryophyllales.

References

Caryophyllales families
Caryophyllales